Kaisay Tum Se Kahoon; is a 2015 Pakistani romantic drama serial  airing on Hum TV based on the novel of Maha Malik. The series is directed by Fahim Burney and produced by Concepts & Fahim Burney, including a stellar cast of Saba Qamar, Adeel Chaudhary, Farhan Ahmed Malhi and Aleezay Tahir.

It aired Sunday evenings at 8pm and is a hugely popular serial, especially abroad in the U.K. where it has been getting record ratings of viewership between 60,000–85,000 viewers in its last few weeks of airing. The drama has a total of 20 episodes.

Synopsis
The story of drama begins off demonstrating Anamta (Saba Qamar), a mother of two, as the joyful housewife who is excessively possessed with her child's birthday celebration. Be that as it may, her better half Mansoor (Adeel Chaudhry) is not a single where to be seen clearly an irritating perception for Anamta's venerating father. 
Anamta, being the typical wife, tries to persuade her father dearest that all's well between the lovebirds, however inside, even she is disturbed by Mansoor's nonappearance as she has dependably observed him lovey dovey and adhering to her at all circumstances previously. 
Mansoor, then again, is screwed over thanks to his associate Bakhtiar who he saw experiencing a heart failure in the parking lot of his workplace and henceforth hurried him to the healing facility. The caring man goes similar to crossing out every one of his arrangements of the day for his sickly contemporary and even chooses to miss his child's birthday party. 
Anamta (called Annu by family) is actually pissed. Be that as it may, dislike she is without organization since her missing cousin Minhaj (otherwise known as Mannu) has as of late come back from abroad and is around the local area nowadays. The flirtatious man dependably had a delicate corner for Annu and still does regardless of her being married. He shows up a gathering and both get to know one another. Mansoor tries to offer some kind of reparation by taking his family to a picnic, transport as it would turn out, Mrs. Bakhtiar calls him and reveals to him how her unwell spouse needs him badly at the hospital. The caring Mansoor again cancels the picnic and chooses to go tend to his colleague. 
Annu is miserable and mannu who additionally goes to the outing rubs salt into her injuries by embedding misguided judgments in her mind about her husband. The drama closes indicating Annu floored by the presence of an obscure woman at her home sound sleeping in her stay with a child. We the gatherings of people know her identity Bakhtiar's wife with his child who Mansoor as a signaling brings to his own place-in any case, Annu doesn't.

Cast

Saba Qamar as Anamta
Adeel Chaudhry as Mansoor
Farhan Ahmed Malhi as 'Ajju'
Alizay Tahir as Noor-ul-Ain
Irfan Khoosat as Anamta's father
Tariq Tayyab
Kamran Mujahid

References

External links
 Official Hum Tv Website
 Watch Kaise Tumse Kahoon All Episodes

Hum TV original programming
Urdu-language television shows
Pakistani drama television series
2015 Pakistani television series debuts
2015 Pakistani television series endings